The American Barbecue Showdown is a 2020 reality television web series filmed in Covington, Georgia that premiered on Netflix on September 18, 2020. On August 9, 2021, Netflix renewed the series for a second season.

Concept
Contestants from across America competing in a Barbecue Cook-off to be crowned American Barbecue Champion. Starting with 8 contestants, each of whom having differing levels of barbecuing experience, they have to face challenges cooking in different styles sometimes with extra surprise challenges. There is a focus not just on the cooking aspect but maintaining the barbecue's temperature and smoking abilities. Each cooking task has to be completed within a set time frame often lower than the normal amount of time used to prepare and cook the specified meal.

Cast
 Kevin Bludso, judge
 Melissa Cookston, judge
 Rutledge Wood, host
 Lyric Lewis, host

Episodes

Season 1 (2020)

Contestant progress

Release 
The American Barbecue Showdown was released on September 18, 2020, on Netflix.

References

External links
 
 

2020s American reality television series
2020 American television series debuts
English-language Netflix original programming
Television series by All3Media
Television shows filmed in Georgia (U.S. state)
Cooking competitions in the United States
Food reality television series